Edward John Rudge,  (1792–1861) was a British barrister and antiquary. He was elected Fellow of the Royal Society in 1847.

The son of Edward Rudge, botanist and antiquary, and Anne Rudge, botanical illustrator, he attended Caius College, Cambridge, and was barrister-at-law, fellow of the Society of Antiquaries of London, and author of Some Account of the History and Antiquities of Evesham (1820) on the town of Evesham, and the Illustrated and Historical Account of Buckden Palace (1839).

References

External links 
 Short biography at University of Toronto libraries

Attribution

1792 births
1861 deaths
Fellows of the Royal Society
Fellows of the Society of Antiquaries of London
English barristers
English antiquarians
19th-century English lawyers